Denver Township is located in Richland County, Illinois. As of the 2010 census, its population was 411 and it contained 162 housing units. Before May 2, 1859, the locale was known as Boone Township.

Geography

Demographics

References

External links
City-data.com
Illinois State Archives

Townships in Richland County, Illinois
Townships in Illinois